Richard Locke is an American critic and essayist. He is a professor of writing at Columbia University School of the Arts and formerly served as the first editor-in-chief of the redesigned Vanity Fair and president of the National Book Critics Circle.

Biography 
He received a B.A. from Columbia University, a B.A. from Clare College, Cambridge University, and did graduate work at Harvard University. He was Professor of Writing in the Writing Program at Columbia University School of the Arts, where he has also served as director of Nonfiction Writing and as department chair.

He has also been a senior editor at Simon & Schuster, where he worked as assistant to Robert Gottlieb, deputy editor of The New York Times Book Review, the first editor in chief of the relaunched Vanity Fair (1983), a lecturer at the English Institute, Harvard University, and a Poynter Fellow at Yale University. He has served as a judge of the National Book Award and the Pulitzer Prize Jury in Criticism, and as a director and president of The National Book Critics Circle.

He is the author of more than 180 essays and reviews that have appeared in The New York Times Book Review, the Wall Street Journal, The American Scholar, The Threepenny Review, Bookforum, Salmagundi, The Yale Review, The Atlantic, The New Republic, and other publications. His book Critical Children: The Use of Children in Ten Great Novels, an examination of works by British and American writers from Dickens to Philip Roth that use children as vehicles of moral and cultural interrogation, was published in September 2011 by Columbia University Press.

References

External links
 

American critics
American essayists
Living people
Columbia College (New York) alumni
Alumni of Clare College, Cambridge
Harvard University alumni
The New York Times writers
Vanity Fair (magazine) editors
Year of birth missing (living people)
Presidents of the National Book Critics Circle